Contra (real name Margus Konnula; born 22 March 1974, in Urvaste, Võru County) is an Estonian poet and translator.

After 1994, he worked as a postman. From 1996 to 1999, he was the postmaster at Urvaste. After this job, he became a freelance writer and screenwriter. From 2004 to 2008, he was the editor of the local newspaper of the Urvaste Parish.

He has won numerous Estonian-related and also other country awards. For example, in 2017, he received the Eduards Veidenbaums Literary Award. In 2019, he received the Latvian Cross of Recognition (V class).

Selected works
 1995: poetry collection "Ohoh"
 2001: poetry collection "Suusamütsi tutt" ('Ski Hat Bobble')
 2019: poetry collection "Legoist"

References

External links
 Contra at Estonian Writers' Online Dictionary

1974 births
Living people
Estonian male poets
Estonian translators
21st-century Estonian poets
People from Antsla Parish